The National Jewish Retreat (NJR) is the largest Jewish retreat in the United States.
The Retreat draws upwards of 1000 participants to an unusual five-day Jewish immersion experience. The program, led by renowned thinkers, scholars and personalities, advertises itself as offering meaningful Jewish enrichment.

Started in 2006 as a project of the Rohr Jewish Learning Institute, the National Jewish Retreat has been held in Colorado, Utah, Connecticut, Virginia, Florida & Illinois.

The 2010 retreat became the subject of media interest when it was reported that former senator George Allen would publicly discuss his mother's Jewish heritage for the first time since the rumors were substantiated.

Other participants include Rabbis Yisroel Meir Lau, Yoel Kahn, Manis Friedman, Simon Jacobson, Yossi Jacobson and many others.

Scholars in Residence 

Previous scholars in residence include:
 Hon. George Allen, Mount Vernon, Virginia
 Rabbi Benjamin Blech, New York, New York
 Richard Blumenthal, Hartford, Connecticut 
 Dr. Erica Brown, Silver Spring, Maryland

References

External links
 Official website
 The Jewish Learning Institute

Chabad in the United States
Chabad organizations
Conferences in the United States
Cultural conferences